The Empire at Broadway was a planned high-rise office tower in Providence, Rhode Island. The project was ultimately cancelled, though only after the demolition of the La Salle Square Public Safety Complex, which occupied the planned site.

As planned, the project featured a 22 story office tower with a 522 space parking garage and 496,000 ft² of retail space. If built, the structure would have stood as the 5th tallest in the city and state.

After cancellation, the Procaccianti Group, the developer of the project, converted the site into surface parking.

References 

Skyscrapers in Providence, Rhode Island
Proposed skyscrapers in the United States
Office buildings in Providence, Rhode Island